Heckman Pass is a mountain pass in the Rainbow Range of west-central British Columbia, Canada, located west of Anahim Lake on the divide between the Chilcotin Plateau and the Bella Coola Valley.  It is used by British Columbia Highway 20 and was the route used by Alexander Mackenzie on his journey to the Pacific Coast at Bella Coola via the grease trail along the West Road River from the Fraser.

See also
List of mountain passes

References

Mountain passes of British Columbia
Landforms of the Chilcotin
Coast Mountains